Tachykinin-3 is a protein that in humans is encoded by the TAC3 gene.

See also
Neurokinin B
Tachykinin receptor 3

References

Further reading